The Crusades is a 1935 American historical adventure film produced and directed by Cecil B. DeMille, and originally released by Paramount Pictures. It stars Loretta Young as Berengaria of Navarre and Henry Wilcoxon as Richard I of England. It was nominated for an Academy Award for Best Cinematography (Victor Milner) as well as for Best Foreign Film at the Venice Film Festival in 1935.

The film's copyright was renewed.

Plot 

The film takes many of its elements and main characters from the Third Crusade, which was prompted by the Saracen capture of Jerusalem and the crusader states in the Holy Land in A.D. 1187. The character of King Richard the Lionheart is a man of action but little thought. A hermit from Jerusalem arrives in Europe and starts gathering support for a Crusade. The hermit convinces a number of European rulers to travel to Jerusalem in order to bring the Holy City into Christian hands. Richard enlists in order to avoid an arranged betrothal to the King of France's sister, Princess Alice of France, but is followed by the Countess on the Crusade. A plot is laid against Richard's life by his brother Prince John and Conrad, Marquis of Montferrat. En route to the war, Richard meets Berengaria, Princess of Navarre. In order to get food for his men, Richard reluctantly marries her in exchange for her father's cattle and grain. Berengaria is forced to accompany Richard to the Holy Land.

During the Crusaders' attempts to get past the walls of Acre, the allies assemble in conference, but in disarray. Richard receives word that his brother John has seized the throne of England. Richard's ally,  Philip II of France, is enraged at Richard's rejection of his sister Alice, but Richard defies Philip and the other troubled allies by proclaiming Berengaria Queen of England. The Christian leaders meet in parley with the Muslim Sultan and leader Saladin. Saladin is struck by Berengaria's beauty and bravery in supporting her husband. However, he rejects any truce with the Crusaders, and declares that the arrogant Richard will "never pass the gates of Jerusalem."

Berengaria is fearful that her presence in camp is causing disloyalty among Richard's allies, in particular the powerful French King Philip, and may harm their holy quest. Seeking death, she enters no man's land between the lines, only to be wounded and captured by the forces of Saladin. The hermit, the Christian "holy man" who had preached the Crusade, also is captured. Saladin escapes the siege, and after finding Berengaria wounded, brings her to Jerusalem to care for her, with admiration and growing affection. Not knowing this Richard and the Crusaders storm Acre to save the Queen of England.

The internal plot against Richard's life is hatched by Conrad and disloyal soldiers. Conrad reveals his plot to Saladin, expecting to be rewarded. Appalled by Conrad's treachery, Saladin orders Conrad to be immediately executed. Berengaria offers herself to Saladin if he will intervene and save Richard's life. Saladin sends a few of his soldiers to warn Richard who is searching the battle field at night for the body of a friend. Conrad's men attack Richard but are defeated by Saladin's soldiers who take the English King to Saladin. Richard and Saladin agree to a truce and the gates of Jerusalem are opened to all Christians with the exception of Richard, in keeping with Saladin's earlier promise. After losing his kingship, his wife and the opportunity to see the Holy City, Richard prays for the first time, asking God for him to be reunited with his wife. Richard encounters Berengaria on her way to the Holy City. He admits his mistakes and Berengaria tells him that Saladin has freed her along with the other Christian captives. Berengaria proceeds alone toward Jerusalem to visit the Holy City and promises to return to him.

Cast
Loretta Young – Berengaria, Princess of Navarre
Henry Wilcoxon – Richard, King of England
Ian Keith – Saladin, Sultan of Islam
C. Aubrey Smith – The Hermit
Katherine DeMille – Alice, Princess of France
Joseph Schildkraut – Conrad, Marquis of Montferrat
Alan Hale – Blondel
C. Henry Gordon – Philip the Second, King of France
George Barbier – Sancho, King of Navarre
Montagu Love – The Blacksmith
Ramsay Hill – John, Prince of England
Lumsden Hare – Robert, Earl of Leicester
Maurice Murphy – Alan, Richard's Squire
William Farnum – Hugo, Duke of Burgundy
Hobart Bosworth – Frederick, Duke of the Germans
Pedro de Córdoba – Karakush
Mischa Auer – Monk
Albert Conti – Leopold, Duke of Austria
Sven Hugo Borg – Sverre, The Norse King
Paul Sotoff – Michael, Prince of Russia
Fred Malatesta – William, King of Sicily
Hans von Twardowski – Nicholas, Count of Hungary
Anna Demetrio – Duenna
Perry Askam – Soldier
Vallejo Gantner – Marshal of France

Music score
The film is noted for its spectacular film score, composed by Rudolph G. Kopp, along with the work of such other uncredited composers as Heinz Roemheld, Milan Roder, Frederick Hollander, John Leipold and Herman Hand. It includes the "Hymn of Joy," by Kopp, with lyrics by Harold Lamb; "Soldier's Song," by Kopp and Lamb; and the stirring "Song of the Crusades," by Kopp and Richard A. Whiting, with lyrics by Lamb and Leo Robin, and special choral lyrics by Jeanie Macpherson, heard at the beginning of the film and as the crusaders march to battle.

Reception
Andre Sennwald of The New York Times called the film a "grand show" and "two hours of tempestuous extravaganza". Sennwald also praised the "superbly managed" staging of the attack on the city of Acre and cited "excellent performances"  all around, stating in conclusion, "It is rich in the kind of excitement that pulls an audience irresistibly to the edge of its seat." Variety also praised the film, writing, "Probably only DeMille could make a picture like Crusades – and get away with it. It's long, and the story is not up to some of his previous films, but the production has sweep and spectacle." Film Daily declared it "one of the best DeMille pictures ... The battle scenes are among the most thrilling made since the inception of talking pictures." John Mosher of The New Yorker was less enthused, finding it "rather mild De Mille" that "doesn't compare by a long shot with many other scenes in the Master's collection. There is nothing in the film as astonishing as his Passing through the Red Sea, nothing as amazingly ornamental as his arenas of Imperial Rome." Mosher did praise Wilcoxon's performance, however, especially in his scenes with Young. Similarly reserved, Graham Greene writing for The Spectator described it as "a very long film" with a "stuffy horsehair atmosphere of beards and whiskers", and criticized its historical accuracy as "a little quiet fun at the expense of Clio" with as "complete [a] lack of period sense" as "decorated mid-Victorian Bibles". Greene did praise de Mille's "childlike eye for details", however, and characterized the set-piece scenes (e.g. the cavalry charge and the storming of Acre) as "scenes of real executive genius".

Cultural context
Lorraine K. Stock writes in Hollywood in the Holy Land, in her chapter "Now Starring in the Third Crusade" that Crusading films have been used by European and American countries to spread a political or cultural agenda. One way with which this is done is through the main Crusading "heroes" such as Richard the Lionheart and main antagonist Saladin. Many films have used the relationship between Richard I and Saladin. In this particular film the relationship between Richard I and Saladin is connected not only by the conflict of the Crusade but "an improbable, if entertaining, erotic triangle" with Berengaria of Navarre. Stock notes that this relationship and the events which occur can be seen as a reaction to events after the First World War and especially America's isolationism. For example, Richard the Lionheart at first does not want to get married, so he goes on Crusade despite showing signs of not being religious. Berengaria can also be seen as a "medieval League of Nations" when negotiations between Saladin and Richard I occur at the end of the movie.
 
A main concern for such films is the way Muslims and Crusaders are portrayed. Throughout the film Stock notes that there are a negative portrayals of Saladin and the Muslims. For instance Stock notes that the Crusaders are all dressed in mail armor with the cross upon their chests, while Saladin and the Saracens are dressed mainly in "flowing robes of luxury fabrics" and "silken sashes". The Saracens are shown as oriental but also "exotically feminized" according to Stock. Another scene has the Saracens shoot a Crusader messenger, who demands surrender of the city, with one of them wearing a helmet with devil horns upon it. There are other moments in which the Europeans mention devilry or call Muslims infidels. Stock says DeMille established "the stereotypes of Richard and Saladin that subsequent films would repeat…".

However, Saladin is also depicted as an honorable man. In "Islam, Muslims and Arabs in the Popular Hollywood Cinema", Anton K. Kozlovic writes "The Crusades was not as enthusiastically received in the West as DeMille would have liked (Bichard 2004, 292) probably because it showed the good and noble side of the Muslims and contrasted it with the darker deeds of Christianity". Saladin in the film refuses to help assassinate Richard I and in fact sends out help to prevent Richard from being killed by the treacherous other Europeans. Kozlovic also notes that when Saladin offers peace to the "foes of Islam", Richard responds by drawing his sword "and saying 'We are going to slaughter you!'". Kozlovic sees DeMille's film as a challenge to the stereotypical norm and negative picture painted of Muslims in Crusader films specifically.

Home media
This film, along with  The Sign of the Cross, Four Frightened People, Cleopatra and Union Pacific, was released on DVD in 2006 by Universal Studios as part of The Cecil B. DeMille Collection.

References

External links 

 http://www.new-video.de/film-die-kreuzritter-the-crusaders/

1935 films
American historical drama films
American black-and-white films
1930s English-language films
Films directed by Cecil B. DeMille
1930s historical drama films
Films set in the 12th century
Paramount Pictures films
Universal Pictures films
Crusades films
American films based on actual events
Cultural depictions of Richard I of England
Films with screenplays by Dudley Nichols
Cultural depictions of John, King of England
1935 drama films
1930s American films